The special unit Polizeiliche Schutzaufgaben Ausland der Bundespolizei (PSA BPOL) ("Police Protection Tasks Abroad of the Federal Police", formerly known as ASSIK for Arbeitsstab Schutzaufgaben in Krisengebieten) is a specialized unit of the German Federal Police tasked with providing personal security for German diplomatic missions in conflict regions.

Background 
The protection of German diplomatic missions is one of the tasks of the German Federal Police. In conflict, the diplomatic protection was carried out by the GSG9 with support of the Federal Criminal Police Office. In 2008, the Federal Ministry of the Interior tasked the Federal Police with reorganizing this form of protection in order to reduce the workload of the GSG9.

Organization
Due to the positive responses of the newly established ASSIK, the Federal Police decided to continue the unit as section 44 (Referat 44).
 In January 2009 ASSIK is tasked with the protection of the embassy personnel in Kabul, Afghanistan
 Since January 2010 ASSIK took over the protection of the embassy personnel in Bagdad, Iraq.

In June 2012, section 44 was dissolved and the unit was attached under the command of the GSG9.

Due to the continuously deteriorating security in various regions, PSA BPOL was tasked with an increasing number of deployments which include the embassies in Yemen, Libya or short-term missions such as in Egypt during the revolution of 2011 and Haiti during the 2010 earthquake.

On August 1, 2017 the Department 11  (BPOLD 11) was formed as an umbrella organization for all specialized units of the Federal Police (i.e. GSG9 and aviation unit) which also included PSA.

Selection and Training 
Any officer of the Federal German Police with at least 8 years of service may apply for the selection process. The selection process is followed by three months of specialized training which includes:

 Personal security detail training
 Defensive driving
 Marksmanship
 Combat casualty care

Upon completion of the first sections of training a stronger emphasis is placed on missions in hazardous regions.

Deployments and cooperations 

PSA officers deploy in rhythms of three months which are followed by periods of six months in Germany. The periods in Germany are used to train other PSA officers which are currently in pre-deployment training.

One PSA officer was killed during his deployment in Sanaa (Yemen) in October 2013.

PSA cooperates closely with other units with similar tasks. An a result of the cooperation with the Dutch BSB, the EU-funded project Black Griffin was established which enables several special units tasked with close protection duties to cross-train and to cooperate. Other participants include EKO Cobra from Austria or the Mobile Security Deployments from the United States.

Equipment 
 HK USP
 HK G36C
 HK P30
 HK 21
 Ballistic vests

Further reading

References

External links

 Official site
 Recruitment site

GSG 9
Police units of Germany
Non-military counterterrorist organizations
Specialist law enforcement agencies of Germany
Protective security units